Navaratnalu are a set of nine welfare schemes introduced by Y. S. Jagan Mohan Reddy, the Chief minister of Andhra Pradesh,  as promised during Praja Sankalpa Yatra (political campaign tour on foot) before 2019 assembly elections.

YSR Rythu Bharosa

Under the scheme, farmers from economically poor backgrounds are financially assisted by the government by depositing ₹13,500 per annum in three installments, in association with Pradhan Mantri Kisan Samman Nidhi with the state government contributing ₹7500 and the center ₹6000.

Jagananna Vidya Deevena

Government of Andhra Pradesh has launched a welfare scheme namely Jagananna Vidya Deevena where the full fee including the tuition, special and examination fee is reimbursed for students from poor economic backgrounds.

YSR Arogyasri
The scheme is the extended version of Aarogyasri launched by late Chief minister of Andhra Pradesh Y. S. Rajasekhara Reddy where free health care is provided for all the people of below poverty line once the hospital bill crosses ₹1000 covering 2,200 medical procedures.

YSR Jala Kala
Under the scheme, government digs borewells for free benefiting over three lakh farmers hailing from below poverty line.

Prohibition of liquor
The revised liquor policy has been introduced in the state where the alcohol is subjected to be banned in a phased manner. All the belt shops in the state have been shut down and the total number of liquor shops in the state have been by 33 percent.

Jagananna Ammavodi

The scheme has been launched to encourage parents to send their children to school by depositing ₹15,000 rupees of financial assistance in the bank account of student's mother.

YSR Aasara and YSR Cheyutha

 YSR Aasara is a government welfare scheme that has been launched to improve the productivity of Self Help Groups(SHGs) by reimbursing the outstanding loans and improve the lifestyle of urban and rural women.
 YSR Cheyutha is a government welfare scheme that has been launched to assist women aged 45–60 from weaker socio-economic background by providing financial benefit of ₹75000 over the period of four years.

Housing for poor
Under the scheme, 25 lakh houses are subjected to be constructed in 5 years for citizens living below poverty line which is popularly known as Navaratnalu Pedalandariki Illu.

YSR Pension Kanuka

The pension amount for senior citizens, disabled people and transgenders has been hiked also revising the age eligibility to 60 years from 65 years.

References 

Government welfare schemes in Andhra Pradesh